Tschögl is a surname.  Notable people with the surname include:

Florian Tschögl, Austrian Righteous Among the Nations
John Tschogl (born 1950), American basketball player